Percy Rivington Pyne may refer to:
Percy Rivington Pyne I (1820–1895), President of City National Bank
Percy Rivington Pyne II (1857–1929), built Percy R. Pyne House in Manhattan
Percy Rivington Pyne Jr. (1896–1941), decorated WWI aviator
Percy Rivington Pyne 2nd (1882–1950), banker and golf champion